Seriana District is a district of Batna Province, Algeria.

Municipalities
The district further divides into three municipalities.
Seriana
Lazrou
Zanat El Beida

Districts of Batna Province